The Sixteen are a United Kingdom-based choir and period instrument orchestra; founded by Harry Christophers, they started as an unnamed group of sixteen friends in 1977, giving their first billed concert in 1979.

The group performs early English polyphony, works of the Renaissance, Baroque and early Classical music, and a diversity of 20th- and 21st-century music.

The Sixteen are "The Voices of Classic FM", TV media partner with Sky Arts and associate artists of the Southbank Centre in London and Bridgewater Hall in Manchester.  The group promotes an annual series at the Queen Elizabeth Hall as well as the Choral Pilgrimage, a tour of Britain's finest cathedrals: bringing music back to the buildings for which it was written.  The BBC television series Sacred Music was produced in collaboration with The Sixteen; between 2008 and 2015, two full series aired, along with numerous specials.

The Sixteen is a registered charity under English law.

Tours

The Sixteen tour throughout Europe, Japan, Australia and the Americas and have given regular performances at major concert halls and festivals worldwide, including the Barbican Centre in London, the Bridgewater Hall in Manchester, the Concertgebouw in Amsterdam, the Sydney Opera House, Tokyo Opera City and the Vienna Musikverein. They have also performed at the BBC Proms and the festivals of Granada, Lucerne, Istanbul, Prague and Salzburg.. In the United Kingdom, each year since 2000 (excepting pandemic years) they have toured a selection of UK cathedrals and other venues with a tour entitled the Choral Pilgrimage. 

In addition, the Sixteen's period orchestra have taken part in semi-staged performances of Purcell's Fairy Queen in Tel Aviv and London, a fully staged production of Purcell's King Arthur in Lisbon's Centro Cultural de Belém , followed by new productions of Claudio Monteverdi's Il ritorno d'Ulisse in patria at Lisbon Opera House and The Coronation of Poppea at the English National Opera.

Education
The Sixteen have an education programme and recent projects include a series of school matinées for hundreds of primary school children in Bury St Edmunds, Liverpool and Southwell under the national Sing Up initiative. The Sixteen also have close ties with the Guildhall School of Music and Drama and Trinity College of Music, offering opportunities for young people about to embark on careers as professional musicians.

Discography

Over 90 recordings reflect the Sixteen's range of work, spanning the music of 500 years and winning many awards including the Grand Prix du Disque, numerous Schallplattenkritik, a Gramophone Award (Early Music, 1992), the Classical Brit Award in 2005 for Renaissance and IKON, which was nominated for a Grammy Award and two Classical Brits.  These latter two discs were recorded as part of the group's contract with Universal Classics and Jazz.

Since 2001, the Sixteen have had their own record label, CORO, which has released over 90 titles to date.  Recent recordings include Handel's oratorio Messiah, with soloists Carolyn Sampson, Catherine Wyn-Rogers, Mark Padmore and Christopher Purves (winner of a MIDEM Classical Award 2009), Dixit Dominus featuring Handel's eponymous early work and Steffani's Stabat Mater, Ceremony and Devotion:  Music for the Tudors, which accompanied the 2010 Choral Pilgrimage and Hail, Mother of the Redeemer, which accompanied the 2011 Choral Pilgrimage.

See also
 
 The Clerks
 Hilliard Ensemble
 I Fagiolini
 Tallis Scholars
 Handel and Haydn Society

References

External links
Official website
The Voices of Classic FM
Harry Christophers interview with Paris Konstantinidis (2007)

Early music choirs
English choirs
British early music ensembles
Musical groups established in 1979
Charities based in England